Wharf Area Historic District is a national historic district located at Staunton, Virginia. The district encompasses 22 contributing buildings and 4 contributing structures.  It is a warehouse and commercial district characterized by rows of late-19th century and early-20th century storefronts and an elongated plaza framed by small warehouses.  The buildings are characteristically two- and three-story, brick structures in a variety of popular architectural styles including Greek Revival, Federal, and Queen Anne.  Notable buildings and structures include the Railroad Water Tower, American Hotel (c. 1854), John Burns Building (1874), Erskine Building (1904), and Chesapeake and Ohio Railroad Station (1902).

It was added to the National Register of Historic Places in 1972, with a boundary increase in 1982.

References

Historic districts on the National Register of Historic Places in Virginia
Greek Revival architecture in Virginia
Federal architecture in Virginia
Queen Anne architecture in Virginia
Buildings and structures in Staunton, Virginia
National Register of Historic Places in Staunton, Virginia